Breadalbane was an 1843 British three-masted merchant barque that was crushed by ice and sank in the Arctic in 1853. Notable as one of the northernmost shipwrecks known, she is also considered one of the best-preserved wooden ships ever found in the sea due to slow deterioration in the cold Arctic water. Historically, Breadalbane is considered to be a time capsule.

On 21 August 1853, she became trapped by an ice floe and was crushed. Her entire crew of 21 abandoned ship in time and were rescued by her companion, .

In August 1980, the wreck was discovered by a five-man team led by Joe MacInnis working from the Canadian Coast Guard icebreaker Sir John A. McDonald. Three years later it was designated a national historic site of Canada because the ship was used in the search for John Franklin's lost expedition.

Characteristics 
Breadalbane was built by Hedderwich & Rowan for a Scottish merchant consortium in a shipyard on the Clyde River, in Scotland in 1843. She was named after Breadalbane, a region of the Scottish Highlands. The ship was originally used to transport wine, wool and grain to Europe, and spent her first ten years sailing between England and Calcutta carrying various goods.

Breadalbane was a 428-ton, wooden square-rigged sailing ship. The design was similar to hundreds of other trans-oceanic ships used in early Victorian times.

Arctic service 
In the spring of 1853, the Royal Navy called the ship into service to transport coal and other supplies to the North Star, a depot ship. She left the Thames River in 1853, accompanied by HMS Phoenix (the first propeller ship in the Arctic), and arrived at a rallying point at Beechey Island later that year.

Her new mission would be to carry supplies to Sir Edward Belcher's high Arctic search expedition in the Resolute Bay area (now part of Nunavut). Since 1852, Belcher's expedition had been searching for the Franklin Expedition. The ship and crew had gone missing while searching for a passage through the Arctic seas. Belcher's expedition was both the largest, and the last sent by the Royal Navy.

Trapped in ice 
On 21 August 1853, Breadalbane was anchored to an ice floe half a mile south of Beechey Island in Lancaster Sound, approximately 500 miles north of the Arctic Circle. It had  become surrounded by slow-moving ice. Shortly after midnight, a slab of ice penetrated the starboard bow.

The crew quickly salvaged as many supplies and personal items as possible. The 21-man crew then abandoned the ship. The crew was rescued by HMS Phoenix.

Shipwreck 
The wreck of Breadalbane was first discovered in August 1980, by a team led by Joseph B. MacInnis. Two previous attempts in 1978 and 1979 failed to find any trace of the ship. She was lying intact on the seafloor with two of her three masts still standing and her bow pointing east.

It was revealed a debris field with the fallen mast, the ship's copper-sheathed lower hull, and a flat-roofed deckhouse. A small cabinet on the aft end of the deckhouse held a compass and signal light. Below the cabinet was the wooden steering wheel. The ship was wrapped in soft, pink coral.

In 1983, another four manned- and six remotely operated vehicle dives were made, during which the ship's wheel was recovered and turned over to Parks Canada for preservation and display.

Footnotes

Further reading

External links 

 

1843 ships
1980 archaeological discoveries
1983 establishments in Canada
Maritime incidents in August 1853
National Historic Sites in Nunavut
Protected areas established in 1983
Ships built on the River Clyde
Shipwrecks in the Arctic Ocean